John Contoulis (born October 9, 1940) is a former American football defensive tackle. He played for the New York Giants in 1964.

References

1940 births
Living people
American football defensive tackles
UConn Huskies football players
New York Giants players